The 1-deoxysphingolipids (1-deoxySLs) are an atypical and recently discovered class of sphingolipids (SLs). They are formed during the nove synthesis pathway and their essential C1-OH deficit causes the malfunctions of the following transformations to achieve complex sphingolipids. In general, sphingolipids are formed during a reaction that is catalyzed by the SPT enzyme (serine-palmitoyltransferase) where the condensation of serine and palmitoyl-CoA takes place. The origin of this rare sphingolipid, though, is due to a defect of the SPT which can also use (as substrats) alanine or glycine. This change is what forms the 1-deoxySL.

1-deoxysphingolipids cannot be degraded over the canonical catabolic pathways leading to high 1-deoxySL levels that are involved in several neurological and metabolic disorders.

Structure 
There are two types of 1-deoxySLs: 1-deoxysphinganine and 1-deoxymethylsphinganine.

1-Deoxysphinganine 
It is an amino alcohol and a bioactive sphingoid. Its distinctive trait is that the terminal hydroxy group has been replaced by hydrogen. It has the role of antineoplastic agent, which means it can inhibit or prevent the neoplasms' proliferation. It is also the conjugate base of 1-deoxysphinganine (1+).

This sphingoid base can be found, in general, in low levels, in animal cells. It was found for the first time in a marine organisme. Since then, it has been also known as spisulosine. It is known by other names such as ES-285.

The molecular weight of this compound is 285,5 g/mol and its molecular formula is C18H39NO, which means it has 18 carbons.

1-Deoxymethylsphinganine 
It is a bioactive sphingoid which derives from the sphinganine. It is formed by a sphingoid and an amino alcohol and it constitutes the conjugated base of 1-deoxymethylsphinganine (1+). Its role is accepting a hydron from a donor via its organic amino compound; it is a Brønsted base.

It is also known as deoxymethyl-SA, (2R)-1-aminoheptadecan-2-ol and 1-desoxymethylsphinganine.

The molecular weight of this compound is 271,48 g/mol and its molecular formula is  C17H37NO, which means it has 17 carbons.

In relation to its appearance, it has a powder form. Other physical and chemical properties are not certainly known.

Localization 
Sphingolipid metabolism is based in compartmentalization. In this way, possible cycles of opposite anabolism and catabolism reactions are avoided.

The ER is the compartment where the synthesis of ceramide is produced. Then, it will move to the Golgi apparatus. If the ceramide transporter protein is involved, it will go to the TGN to form sphingomyelin. If the vesicles are the ones in charge of transport, it will reach the cis zone to become glucosylceramide.

Instead, deoxySL transport and localization in cells is not known for sure. It is true that several studies has proved some of his intracellular behaviours.

What allows to understand the distribution in the cell of 1-deoxysphingolipids is the comparison between the behavior of fluorescent analogs of the SLs (C6-NBD-(dh)-Cer) and the 1-deoxySLs (C6-NBD-deoxy(dh)-Cer). The fact that C6-NBD-deoxy(dh)-Cer is not located in the same compartments as C6-NBD-(dh)-Cer indicates that the absence of C1-OH interferes in the protein and vesicular traffic.

On the other side, it's been found that 1-deoxySLs gave a signal in the mitochondria and remained prominent by using alkyne-1-deoxySA, as well as the co-location in the RE and Golgi markers. The signal was absent in the lysosomes and in the plasma membrane.

A specific change in 1-deoxySLs causes variations in mitochondrial morphology, as well as variations of the same type in the RE when de concentrations are toxic.

Metabolism

Synthesis 
1-DeoxySLs has a similar pattern to sphingolipids during de novo synthesis. The reaction is catalyzed by the enzyme serine palmitoyltransferase (SPT) but instead of condensing palmitoyl-CoA and L-serine, the amino acid substrate is replaced by L-alanina or L-glycine.

This atypical sphingolipids are formed as the result of a mutated SPT (SPTLC1/SPTLC2) with alternative activities. It has also produced by wild-type of SPT under unfavorable conditions where the synthesis of L-serine is diminished and / or the biosynthesis of alanine and glycine is too high.

The result of the reaction with L-alanine forms 1-deoxysphinganine (1-deoxySA; m18:0), while the use of glycerin forms 1-deoxymethylsphinganine (1-deoxymethylSA; m17:0). Both molecules are 1-deoxySLs.

Degradation 
Atypical sphingolipids' lack of C1-OH (hydroxyl group) of sphinganine its the cause they accumulate in the cytoplasm and cannot be degraded. These headless sphingolipids are not able to be phosphorylated and they can neither converted into complex lipids as sphingomyelins and glycosphingolipids (galactosylceramides, gangliosides, cerebrosides ...). Instead, they have toxic effects to the cell.

Despite previous opinions that 1-deoxySLs are dead-end metabolites, new researches prove the opposite. Its concentrations decrease over time because atypical sphingolipids convert into downstream products, which normally are polyunsaturated and polyhydroxylated. The main reason for this transformation is detoxification. The enzymes involved in this process produce the change within several days, making it a slow conversion. This take places in two stages:

 Firstly, the hydroxylation of compounds begins by cytochrome P450 enzymes.
 Secondly, hydrophilic moieties join up to the compounds in order to increase water solubility. As a result, the excretion through urine occurs and compounds can be removed.

Either CYP4A or CYP4F are the enzymes involved in the downstream metabolism of 1-deoxySLs. It is not yet known which one takes place in the process but, it is more likely to be CYP4F as in mouse experiments this enzyme is responsible for 1-deoxySLs formation.

Physico-chemical properties 
Nowadays there is not much information about the properties of 1-deoxysphingolipids. However, there have been some studies that demonstrate some important facts. This data is still not proven to be the same in each 1-deoxysphingolipids but, until then, we extrapolate with caution in order to keep investigating and gathering more information.

The biggest two structural properties that differ from the canonical sphingoid bases are the lack of C1-OH and the double bond position. The missing C1 hydroxyl group is a decisive characteristic that influences in the molecule's interactions, as its ability to form intra and intermolecular H-bond networks decreases. On the other hand, the lack of the double bond interferences in the main transition temperature.

These characteristics are thought to make a big impact on the membrane biophysical properties as well as the integrity. The hydrophobicity and the main transition temperature of these lipids play an important role on the structure and physico-chemical properties of biological membranes. These both differences disrupt the setting up with other lipids and as a result, the capacity to segregate into tightly packed gel domains is put in risk.

Function 
Up until now, sphingolipids functions have not been yet known. In any case, its danger contributes to the development of several neuropathies and diseases.

Toxicity 
There are some diseases which causes are due to the formation of 1-deoxySLs and doxSA. For example, HSAN1 is caused because of the formation of this atypical and neurotoxic sphingolipid metabolites (doxSA and 1-deoxySLs). Moreover, it has been found that pacients with type 2 diabetes, autonomic neuropathy type 1 (HSAN1) and hereditary sensory have elevated number of this kind of sphingolipids in their plasma. There are some investigations  that affirm that plasma concentrations in patients with diabetes or the metabolic syndrome were higher than the control group's concentrations. The increase of 1-deoxySLs in metabolic disorders is curiously related to a fatty acid and carbohydrate metabolic dysregulation, that also affects to L-serine metabolism.

We are capable to synthesize an alkyne analog of 1- deoxysphinganine (doxSA), which is the metabolic precursor of all deoxySLs. This is useful for us in order to trace the metabolism of deoxySLs. With this information, now we are able to know that the metabolism of this lipids is restricted to only some lipid species.

Considering the fact that we do not know much of the 1-deoxySL, there are some investigations that try to find a possible treatment for the diseases caused by this sphingolipid. In some of the experiments, there are hypothesis about a possible diabetic neuropathy treatment. This one consists in an oral L-serine supplementation since it has been demonstrated that this substance lowered 1-deoxySL concentrations in plasma.

References 

Lipids